Ricardo Astudillo Suárez (born 26 June 1975) is a Mexican politician affiliated with the PVEM. He currently serves as Deputy of the LXII Legislature of the Mexican Congress representing Querétaro.

References

1975 births
Living people
Politicians from Mexico City
Ecologist Green Party of Mexico politicians
21st-century Mexican politicians
Universidad del Valle de México alumni
Members of the Congress of Querétaro
Deputies of the LXII Legislature of Mexico
Members of the Chamber of Deputies (Mexico) for Querétaro